Kayal may refer to: Fish in Tamil. Since fish are found abundant in lake, lake is also given name kayalveli.

People

Beram Kayal (born 1988),  Israeli professional footballer
Neeraj Kayal, Indian computer scientist

Other

The Malayalam term for a lake; see Geography of Kerala
A type of Hindustani music; see Khyal
Kayal (film), a 2014 Tamil film 
Kayalpatnam, a town in Tamil Nadu, India